Diane Evans could refer to: 

Diane Carlson Evans (born 1946), American Army nurse
Diane L. Evans, American geologist
Diane Evans, fictional character on the American television series Roswell

See also
Diana Evans (born 1972), British writer